The 2nd constituency of Ariège is a French legislative constituency, covering the north of the Ariège département.

Deputies

Election results

2022

 
 
 
 
 
 
 
 
 
|-
| colspan="8" bgcolor="#E9E9E9"|
|-
 
 

 
 
 
 
 

* PS dissident, not in accord with NUPES
Source:

2017

2012

|- style="background-color:#E9E9E9;text-align:center;"
! colspan="2" rowspan="2" style="text-align:left;" | Candidate
! rowspan="2" colspan="2" style="text-align:left;" | Party
! colspan="2" | 1st round
! colspan="2" | 2nd round
|- style="background-color:#E9E9E9;text-align:center;"
! width="75" | Votes
! width="30" | %
! width="75" | Votes
! width="30" | %
|-
| style="background-color:" |
| style="text-align:left;" | Alain Fauré
| style="text-align:left;" | Socialist Party
| PS
| 
| 44.53%
| 
| 67.03%
|-
| style="background-color:" |
| style="text-align:left;" | Philippe Calleja
| style="text-align:left;" | Union for a Popular Movement
| UMP
| 
| 23.56%
| 
| 32.97%
|-
| style="background-color:" |
| style="text-align:left;" | Thérèse Aliot
| style="text-align:left;" | National Front
| FN
| 
| 12.57%
| colspan="2" style="text-align:left;" |
|-
| style="background-color:" |
| style="text-align:left;" | Viviane Baudry
| style="text-align:left;" | Left Front
| FG
| 
| 11.45%
| colspan="2" style="text-align:left;" |
|-
| style="background-color:" |
| style="text-align:left;" | Jacques Pince
| style="text-align:left;" | Regionalist
| REG
| 
| 2.84%
| colspan="2" style="text-align:left;" |
|-
| style="background-color:" |
| style="text-align:left;" | Jimmy Gimenez
| style="text-align:left;" | Regionalist
| REG
| 
| 1.61%
| colspan="2" style="text-align:left;" |
|-
| style="background-color:" |
| style="text-align:left;" | Linda Manceau
| style="text-align:left;" | 
| CEN
| 
| 1.51%
| colspan="2" style="text-align:left;" |
|-
| style="background-color:" |
| style="text-align:left;" | Pierre Granet
| style="text-align:left;" | Far Left
| EXG
| 
| 0.79%
| colspan="2" style="text-align:left;" |
|-
| style="background-color:" |
| style="text-align:left;" | Lucile Souche
| style="text-align:left;" | Far Left
| EXG
| 
| 0.74%
| colspan="2" style="text-align:left;" |
|-
| style="background-color:" |
| style="text-align:left;" | Chantal Clamer
| style="text-align:left;" | Miscellaneous Right
| DVD
| 
| 0.39%
| colspan="2" style="text-align:left;" |
|-
| colspan="8" style="background-color:#E9E9E9;"|
|- style="font-weight:bold"
| colspan="4" style="text-align:left;" | Total
| 
| 100%
| 
| 100%
|-
| colspan="8" style="background-color:#E9E9E9;"|
|-
| colspan="4" style="text-align:left;" | Registered voters
| 
| style="background-color:#E9E9E9;"|
| 
| style="background-color:#E9E9E9;"|
|-
| colspan="4" style="text-align:left;" | Blank/Void ballots
| 
| 2.07%
| 
| 4.36%
|-
| colspan="4" style="text-align:left;" | Turnout
| 
| 62.15%
| 
| 58.96%
|-
| colspan="4" style="text-align:left;" | Abstentions
| 
| 37.85%
| 
| 41.04%
|-
| colspan="8" style="background-color:#E9E9E9;"|
|- style="font-weight:bold"
| colspan="6" style="text-align:left;" | Result
| colspan="2" style="background-color:" | PS HOLD
|}

2007

|- style="background-color:#E9E9E9;text-align:center;"
! colspan="2" rowspan="2" style="text-align:left;" | Candidate
! rowspan="2" colspan="2" style="text-align:left;" | Party
! colspan="2" | 1st round
! colspan="2" | 2nd round
|- style="background-color:#E9E9E9;text-align:center;"
! width="75" | Votes
! width="30" | %
! width="75" | Votes
! width="30" | %
|-
| style="background-color:" |
| style="text-align:left;" | Henri Nayrou
| style="text-align:left;" | Socialist Party
| PS
| 
| 43.00%
| 
| 61.05%
|-
| style="background-color:" |
| style="text-align:left;" | Philippe Calleja
| style="text-align:left;" | Union for a Popular Movement
| UMP
| 
| 30.93%
| 
| 38.95%
|-
| style="background-color:" |
| style="text-align:left;" | Michel Naudy
| style="text-align:left;" | Communist
| COM
| 
| 5.44%
| colspan="2" style="text-align:left;" |
|-
| style="background-color:" |
| style="text-align:left;" | Caroline Couve
| style="text-align:left;" | Democratic Movement
| MoDem
| 
| 4.80%
| colspan="2" style="text-align:left;" |
|-
| style="background-color:" |
| style="text-align:left;" | Thérèse Aliot
| style="text-align:left;" | National Front
| FN
| 
| 3.31%
| colspan="2" style="text-align:left;" |
|-
| style="background-color:" |
| style="text-align:left;" | Françoise Matricon
| style="text-align:left;" | The Greens
| VEC
| 
| 3.30%
| colspan="2" style="text-align:left;" |
|-
| style="background-color:" |
| style="text-align:left;" | Marie-Angèle Claret
| style="text-align:left;" | Far Left
| EXG
| 
| 2.91%
| colspan="2" style="text-align:left;" |
|-
| style="background-color:" |
| style="text-align:left;" | Marie-José Darde
| style="text-align:left;" | Hunting, Fishing, Nature, Traditions
| CPNT
| 
| 1.73%
| colspan="2" style="text-align:left;" |
|-
| style="background-color:" |
| style="text-align:left;" | Chantal Clamer
| style="text-align:left;" | Movement for France
| MPF
| 
| 1.30%
| colspan="2" style="text-align:left;" |
|-
| style="background-color:" |
| style="text-align:left;" | Véronique Rios-Rebaud
| style="text-align:left;" | Divers
| DIV
| 
| 0.93%
| colspan="2" style="text-align:left;" |
|-
| style="background-color:" |
| style="text-align:left;" | Raymond Chaumont
| style="text-align:left;" | Ecologist
| ECO
| 
| 0.66%
| colspan="2" style="text-align:left;" |
|-
| style="background-color:" |
| style="text-align:left;" | Jacqueline Santi
| style="text-align:left;" | Far Left
| EXG
| 
| 0.59%
| colspan="2" style="text-align:left;" |
|-
| style="background-color:" |
| style="text-align:left;" | Pascale Decla
| style="text-align:left;" | Far Right
| EXD
| 
| 0.42%
| colspan="2" style="text-align:left;" |
|-
| style="background-color:" |
| style="text-align:left;" | Françoise Hocquard
| style="text-align:left;" | Majorité Présidentielle
| 
| 
| 0.37%
| colspan="2" style="text-align:left;" |
|-
| style="background-color:" |
| style="text-align:left;" | Pierre Gueguen
| style="text-align:left;" | Far Left
| EXG
| 
| 0.28%
| colspan="2" style="text-align:left;" |
|-
| colspan="8" style="background-color:#E9E9E9;"|
|- style="font-weight:bold"
| colspan="4" style="text-align:left;" | Total
| 
| 100%
| 
| 100%
|-
| colspan="8" style="background-color:#E9E9E9;"|
|-
| colspan="4" style="text-align:left;" | Registered voters
| 
| style="background-color:#E9E9E9;"|
| 
| style="background-color:#E9E9E9;"|
|-
| colspan="4" style="text-align:left;" | Blank/Void ballots
| 
| 2.55%
| 
| 3.82%
|-
| colspan="4" style="text-align:left;" | Turnout
| 
| 65.54%
| 
| 66.36%
|-
| colspan="4" style="text-align:left;" | Abstentions
| 
| 34.46%
| 
| 33.64%
|-
| colspan="8" style="background-color:#E9E9E9;"|
|- style="font-weight:bold"
| colspan="6" style="text-align:left;" | Result
| colspan="2" style="background-color:" | PS HOLD
|}

2002

 
 
 
 
 
 
 
 
 
|-
| colspan="8" bgcolor="#E9E9E9"|
|-

1997

 
 
 
 
 
 
 
 
|-
| colspan="8" bgcolor="#E9E9E9"|
|-

Sources

Further reading
 Official results of French elections: 
 

2